Nový Smokovec is a spa village in Poprad District, Slovakia. It is administratively a part of the town of Vysoké Tatry.

References

Villages and municipalities in Poprad District
Spa towns in Slovakia